Mohamed El-Zanaty Monir (born 1 February 1984 in Giza) is an Egyptian swimmer, who specialized in open water marathon. He represented his nation Egypt at the 2008 Summer Olympics, and has claimed a bronze medal in the 25 km open water race (5:19:23.23) at the 2007 FINA World Championships in Melbourne, Australia.

Mohammad competed as a lone open water swimmer for Egypt in the inaugural men's 10 km marathon at the 2008 Summer Olympics in Beijing. Leading up to the Games, he finished with a nineteenth place time of 1:54:36.4, but managed to pick up the continental spot as Africa's representative at the FINA World Open Water Swimming Championships in Seville, Spain. Farther from the leaders by about ten body lengths, Monir nearly pulled from the end of the field to claim the twentieth spot out of twenty-four entrants in 1:55:17.0, three minutes and twenty-five seconds (3:25) behind eventual gold medalist Maarten van der Weijden of the Netherlands.

References

External links
NBC Olympics Profile

1984 births
Living people
Egyptian male swimmers
Olympic swimmers of Egypt
Swimmers at the 2008 Summer Olympics
World Aquatics Championships medalists in open water swimming
Male long-distance swimmers
Sportspeople from Giza
20th-century Egyptian people
21st-century Egyptian people